The Love Witch is a 2016 American comedy horror film written, edited, directed, produced, and scored by Anna Biller. The film stars Samantha Robinson as Elaine Parks, a modern-day witch who uses spells and magic to get men to fall in love with her with disastrous results. Shot in Los Angeles and Arcata, California, it premiered at the International Film Festival Rotterdam. In May 2016, it was acquired for distribution at the Cannes Marché du Film by Oscilloscope Laboratories.

The film received a limited release in the United States on November 11, 2016. The Love Witch was shot on 35mm film, and printed from an original cut negative. The film was acclaimed by critics for its playful tribute to 1960s horror and Technicolor films, combined with its serious inquiry into contemporary gender roles.

Plot
Elaine, a beautiful young witch, is driving to Arcata, California, a town that tolerates witchcraft, to start a new life after the death of her husband Jerry. It is heavily implied that Elaine may have murdered him. Once there, she rents an apartment in a Victorian home owned by Elaine's mentor Barbara and kept up by its interior decorator, Trish Manning. In an attempt to befriend the young woman, Trish takes Elaine to a teahouse, where she is met by her husband Richard, who is instantly besotted with Elaine after meeting her gaze. Hoping to find a new lover, Elaine performs a ritual to find one and soon meets Wayne, a literature professor at the local college.

The two travel to Wayne's cabin, where she gets him to drink a concoction containing hallucinogens. Once the two have sex Wayne becomes emotional and clingy which proves to be a turnoff for Elaine. He dies the next day and Elaine buries his body along with a witch bottle containing her urine and used tampon. She decides that the next man she will try to seduce will be Richard since he is married and cannot obsess over her. While Trish is away, Elaine invites him over to her apartment, where she also serves him a concoction before seducing him with a dance. The night ends with them having sex. Afterwards, Richard becomes obsessed with Elaine, causing her to abandon their affair.

Unbeknownst to Elaine, one of Wayne's colleagues has reported him missing, leading to police officer Griff to investigate and discover Wayne's body and Elaine's witch bottle. He traces it to Elaine, but falls in love with her and initially refuses to believe that she would be capable of murder, much to the ire of his partner Steve. Elaine shares his love and believes him to be the man of her dreams, even going so far as to hold a mock wedding with her coven at a Renaissance faire.

Griff's superior educates him on the tenuous peace between the town and the witches, then tells him to abandon the pursuit of Elaine as a suspect. When his partner Steve pushes him, he reveals that Wayne died of a heart attack and that the devil's weed found in his system grew around his cabin. For the first time it is revealed that Jerry died from a drug overdose shortly before remarrying, even though he did not take drugs.

Meanwhile, a morose Richard kills himself in his bathtub and is discovered by Trish. Despondent, she invites Elaine to tea again and tries on a ring that Griff gave Elaine during their mock wedding, only to forget to return the ring to Elaine. Trish decides to leave the ring inside Elaine's apartment, where she proceeds to put on Elaine's makeup and underwear, imitating Elaine. Trish eventually discovers a shrine to Elaine's dead lovers, and that Richard was one of them. Trish is caught by Elaine, and Trish viciously attacks Elaine before leaving the apartment with evidence tying Elaine to Richard, swearing Elaine will burn for what she did.

Elaine then goes to the cabaret to meet Griff, who confronts her over the deaths of Wayne and Richard. He tells her that she is tied to both of them by DNA evidence left in Wayne's witch bottle and that items Trish gave him implicate her in Richard's suicide. Despite his earlier love, Griff is unwilling to let Elaine go unpunished. Their conversation is overheard by the cabaret patrons who are prejudiced towards witches and attempt to sexually assault Elaine. Griff helps her escape and the two return to her apartment.

Once safe inside, Elaine concocts a drink for him like she did for the others, but he drops it on the floor instead of drinking it. Realizing that he was correct when telling her that no man can ever love her enough, she shrinks back in disbelief, grabs her athame and stabs him in the heart. With Griff dead, life has imitated art and matches the painting on the wall of them dressed like at their mock wedding and her kneeling over his body with a bloody dagger. In delirium, she smiles and imagines them at their wedding and that Griff actually proposed.

Cast
 Samantha Robinson as Elaine Parks
 Gian Keys as Griff Meadows
 Laura Waddell as Trish
 Jeffrey Vincent Parise as Wayne Peters
 Jared Sanford as Gahan
 Robert Seeley as Richard
 Jennifer Ingrum as Barbara
 Clive Ashborn as Professor King
 Lily Holleman as Shelley Curtis
 Stephen Wozniak as Jerry
 Elle Evans as Star
 Fair Micaela Griffin as Moon

Themes
The Love Witch uses the figure of the witch as a metaphor for women in general, as both an embodiment of men's fears of women, and of women's own innate powers of intuition and as mothers and sorceresses. The lead character of the film is a young woman who uses magic to make men love her. Her character is an examination of the femme fatale archetype. The film embraces the camp of 1960s horror, examining issues of love, desire, and narcissism through a feminist perspective. Anna Biller is a feminist filmmaker whose take on cinema is influenced by feminist film theory.

Production
While writing the script for The Love Witch, Biller had been reading relationship self-help books, and one particular piece of advice that stuck out to her was that if a woman wants to keep a man around, she should love him less than he loves her. She noticed a parallel between this advice and the female characters in classic cinema who love someone to death, such as Ellen in Leave Her to Heaven, so she decided to create the character Elaine in that same vein. Biller also studied witchcraft as research for the film, including trying her own witchcraft practice, and ended up decorating Elaine's apartment with colors from the Thoth tarot deck.

Casting for the film involved a typical audition process, and Biller has said that the most difficult role to fill was that of Trish. Even though she didn't intend for an English actor to play that role, she couldn't find any Americans who were right for it. Biller chose Samantha Robinson for the lead role because she thought Robinson was "very poised and very self-possessed and she [had] a particular quality to her that’s very different from most people nowadays". After Robinson accepted the role, she and Biller watched a series of classic movies featuring women with "great sociopathic performance". The two collaborated closely to develop the character of Elaine so that Robinson's own personality could shape the character, and after this workshop period Biller rewrote parts of the script to adjust for their discoveries.

Filming took place on a sound stage for two weeks, and then on specific locations for the rest of the shoot, including Eureka, California. The tea room scenes were shot in the Herald Examiner Building in Los Angeles.

The film is highly stylized with elaborate set and costume design and a color palette to match the aesthetic of a 1960s Technicolor film. Although the film emulates a 1960s look, the story is set in the present day and features modern cars and mobile phones. One of Biller's stated goals is to bring "female glamor" back to films, and she believes that including stylish, detailed sets and props will fulfill women's fantasies rather than men's, and give viewers more to look at on screen, rather than focusing their attention on the female characters as sexual objects. Anna Biller designed the sets and costumes to emulate the style of classic Hollywood films, a years-long process that involved searching for the necessary vintage furniture at salvage stores or creating it herself if she couldn't find one. For example, it took Biller 6 months to make Elaine's pentagram rug from scratch. Costume design was treated the same way: Biller found vintage pieces that worked well for the film, such as Gunne Sax dresses from the '60s and '70s, but many important pieces she had to make herself. In some cases, she found vintage clothing with fabric in colors that isn't sold anymore to rebuild as needed, in other cases she made pieces from scratch. She spent over a year working full-time designing and building the Renaissance costumes for the mock wedding scene.

She also collaborated closely with her cinematographer M. David Mullen, who is an expert on period cinematography and who has been nominated for two Independent Spirit Awards, to create the hard lighting style characteristic of Classic Hollywood films. Diffusion filters were used on the lens for certain close up shots, and a special kaleidoscope lens was used for drug trip sequence. For the driving scenes, rear projection photography was used to give glamour to the lead actress, and in tribute to the opening of the Hitchcock film The Birds.

The actors also played their parts in a classic presentational acting style, with lead actress Samantha Robinson receiving accolades for her stylized performance.

The Love Witch is one of the last films to cut an original camera negative on 35mm film. It was the only new (non-repertory) feature film presented at the 2016 International Film Festival Rotterdam on 35mm film.

Reception

Critical reception
The Love Witch received universal acclaim. On the review aggregator website Rotten Tomatoes, the film has an approval rating of 95% based on 109 reviews, with an average rating of 7.72/10. The website's critical consensus reads: "The Love Witch offers an absorbing visual homage to a bygone era, arranged subtly in service of a thought-provoking meditation on the battle of the sexes." On Metacritic, the film has a weighted average rating of 82 out of 100, based on 27 critics, indicating "universal acclaim". The film is listed as a "Metacritic must-see".

In a review for The New York Times, A. O. Scott wrote, "Ms. Biller's movie, like its heroine, presents a fascinating, perfectly composed, brightly colored surface. What's underneath is marvelously dark, like love itself."

The Love Witch is listed at number 41 on Rotten Tomatoes' list of the Top 100 Horror Movies. It also made Rolling Stone's list of the top 10 Horror Movies of 2016, The New Yorker's list of the Best Movies of 2016, and IndieWire's list of The Best Movies of 2016.

Awards
The Love Witch won in a tie for the Trailblazer Award and Best Costume Design at the Chicago Indie Critics Awards, and also won the Michael Cimino Best Film Award at the American Independent Film Awards. The Dublin Film Critics' Circle awarded M. David Mullen Best Cinematography for The Love Witch. Samantha Robinson was nominated for Best Actress for the 2017 Fangoria Chainsaw Awards for her performance as Elaine, and Emma Willis was nominated for the Technical Achievement Award for her hair and makeup on the film by the London Film Critics' Circle. In a New York Times editorial, A. O. Scott mentioned Anna Biller as worthy of receiving an Academy Award for Best Original Screenplay for The Love Witch.

References

External links
 
 
 
 
 The Love Witch at Trailer Addict

2016 films
2016 comedy horror films
2016 independent films
2010s American films
2010s English-language films
2010s feminist films
2010s supernatural horror films
American comedy horror films
American feminist comedy films
American independent films
American supernatural horror films
Films about witchcraft
Films directed by Anna Biller
Films set in California
Films shot in Los Angeles
American romantic horror films
American supernatural comedy films
English-language comedy horror films